The Wizard (Bentley Wittman), also known as the Wingless Wizard, is a supervillain appearing in American comic books published by Marvel Comics. He first appeared as an enemy for the Human Torch.

Publication history

The Wizard's first appearance was in Strange Tales #102 and was created by Stan Lee, Larry Lieber, and Jack Kirby.

Fictional character biography

Bentley Wittman grew up possessing near-superhuman levels of genius and was a child prodigy and chess champion. As an adult, he became an inventor of great renown, selling his futuristic inventions to the wealthy and becoming quite rich. He became known as the Wizard by legally assuming this stage name and using his advanced scientific inventions to perform feats of "magic" as a stage magician and escape artist.

Intellectually bored, however, he decided to become a professional criminal and defeat Johnny Storm, who had just appeared to the world as the Human Torch. Pretending to be a victim by pretending his attempt to use a new drill had gone wrong and he was trapped, he really had enough air for weeks, he was rescued by the Torch and invited him to his high-tech, futuristic mansion on Long Island. There he captured the Torch with ease by pretending to take a three-dimensional photo, but really squirting a liquid onto the Torch. The Torch was then locked in an asbestos cell at gunpoint. The Wizard impersonated the Torch, launching a crime spree to destroy the Torch's reputation. However, the Torch escaped and with help from the Invisible Girl, got photos showing the Wizard had impersonated him and the Wizard was sent to prison.

The Wizard had a rematch with the Human Torch before long, escaping from prison using a chemical which melted through stone. He got to his house and used a force field to prevent the police from entering, but allowed the Torch to enter, threatening to blast the police if they tried to get in. The Torch melted a shell the Wizard fired, then created a flaming barrier to protect himself from nerve gas. However the Wizard succeeded in using the Invisible Girl as a hostage, as she had foolishly entered and the Wizard was alerted by an alarm. He trapped both her and the Torch in a chamber with a bomb that would activate if the temperature increased by one degree. However the Torch was able to destroy the device, escape, and capture the Wizard. With Paste-Pot Pete, he battled the Torch again while impersonating him again, and the Wizard captured the Torch and the Invisible Girl after escaping by disguising himself and using an anti-gravity device. However the two escaped when the Torch used his flame to alert Mister Fantastic and the Thing to their location. The conclusion of one encounter with the Torch sent him flying uncontrollably upward by one of his anti-gravity discs, unable to descend safely. He was rescued by two other adversaries of the Torch: the Sandman and Paste-Pot Pete (soon after renamed the Trapster). After he suggested they team up, a suggestion by the Trapster inspired him to form a team that would be a criminal counterpart to the Fantastic Four, with himself, his two rescuers, and Medusa, who was then suffering from amnesia; becoming the Frightful Four.

The Frightful Four proved to be one of the most formidable menaces that the Fantastic Four had yet encountered. The Frightful Four raided the Fantastic Four's Baxter Building headquarters, and affixed the Wizard's anti-gravity discs to the four - minus Johnny, but with Alicia Masters, who managed to alert the Torch with the Invisible Girl's flare gun. Johnny soon appeared and forced the Wizard to use his anti-grav ship to free his team members before they floated into airless space. Then, together they beat the Frightful Four until the Wizard and the Sandman exploded the Wizard's ship as a distraction, and escaped. Later, kidnapping the Invisible Girl, they lured the Fantastic Four to a Pacific atoll where they rigged an experimental "Q-bomb" to detonate. The Fantastic Four narrowly escaped. Weeks later, the Frightful Four made their third attempt. Capturing the Thing, the Wizard used his "id machine" to simulate the Thing's natural tendencies toward violence and brainwash him into obeying the Wizard's commands. The Fantastic Four finally managed to subdue the Frightful Four, then all but Medusa were turned over to the authorities.

In his continued quest to crush the Fantastic Four, the Wizard has tried many iterations of the Frightful Four and has very rarely operated outside the Frightful Four. The Wizard engineered the Sandman's escape from prison, and provided him with a design for a new costume. With the Trapster and Sandman, he battled Medusa. He formed a partnership with Mysterio, and they battled the Torch and Spider-Man, but were foiled by Spider-Man. He battled the Fantastic Four alone, and later battled them once again with the Frightful Four. With the Trapster and Sandman, he invaded the Fantastic Four headquarters, where they encountered Annihilus. The Wizard replaced Medusa with Thundra in the Frightful Four, and they battled the Fantastic Four and Medusa. However, Thundra also ended up betraying him and allying herself with the Fantastic Four as Medusa did. With the Trapster and Sandman, the Wizard battled the Fantastic Four again.

The Wizard, Trapster, and Sandman eventually captured the Fantastic Four. The Frightful Four held auditions for a fourth member of the Frightful Four. Texas Twister showed off his powers and declined membership when they wouldn't pay him. Captain Ultra showed off his powers, but fainted when one of the Frightful Four members lit a cigarette. Osprey auditioned where he wanted them to give him superpowers. Wizard placed one of his anti-gravity disks on Osprey's back which caused him to take off. Wizard stated to the captive Fantastic Four that the anti-gravity disk would set Osprey down somewhere in the southern parts of Bronx. Wizard then spoke on the intercom stating that anyone who doesn't have powers doesn't need to audition... or else. The Frightful Four eventually recruited the Brute (the Reed Richards of the original Counter-Earth) into the Frightful Four where they fought the Fantastic Four and Tigra.

With the Frightful Four, the Wizard later captured Spider-Man and Namor. The Wizard later teamed up with the Plantman, helping him to escape prison and providing him a vehicle and equipment, but then ran into a conflict with the Avengers. With the Mad Thinker and the Puppet Master, the Wizard attempted to disrupt the wedding of the Human Torch and Alicia Masters (Lyja in disguise). The Wizard also captured the Thing and Franklin Richards in an attempt to use them against the Fantastic Four.

When the Sandman appeared to give up his life of crime, the Wizard formed a new Frightful Four with Hydro-Man, Klaw, and Titania. They invaded Fantastic Four headquarters, but sided with the real Fantastic Four against the Fantastic Four clones created by Aron the Watcher. The Wizard later engineered a mass breakout from the Vault. He was later broken out of prison by Loki to join the inner circle of villains organizing the Acts of Vengeance against the Avengers. He freed the Brothers Grimm from prison, and sent them against Spider-Man. With the Mandarin, he then battled the Avengers. However, he then inadvertently led the Avengers to the criminals' base. The Wizard eventually escaped Ryker's Island Prison. With the Trapster, he was also defeated by the reformed Sandman. Often avoiding the limelight that he once embraced, the Wizard hoped to hide from authorities using his former name Bentley Wittman. He was found by the Thunderbolts, however, who convinced the Wizard to provide anti-gravity discs in order for them to battle Graviton, and later, to attach to the Magneto Protocol Satellites. Later still, when the Sandman had appeared to reform his criminal ways, the Wizard took it upon himself to subject his former ally to his id machine, re-integrating the Sandman's mind and restoring him to villainy.

Finally, when the Fantastic Four's popularity reached an all-time low, the Wizard decided it was time to re-form the Frightful Four once more. No longer motivated by petty jealousy, the Wizard believed the Fantastic Four to be the source of all his troubles, his fall from grace. He rescued the Trapster from the Negative Zone, boosted the powers of Hydro-Man, and called upon his ex-wife, Salamandra, to round out the Frightful Four. He also manipulated Cole, his and Salamandra's daughter, to develop a relationship with the Human Torch in order to teleport to her and bypass the Fantastic Four's defenses. During the resulting battle, the Wizard turned on the Trapster, revealing that he intended Cole to be the next member of the Frightful Four. When the Frightful Four defeated the heroes, the Wizard flaunted his success on television and left them humiliated. However, when the Wizard admitted that he only wanted to include Cole once he saw her exhibit superhuman powers, she turned on him. She sought out the Fantastic Four to lead them back to her father and to try to find a cure for her powers. The Wizard and Cole confronted each other, and Cole used one of the Trapster's traps to ensnare her father, then used her powers over gravity to bring the Wizard's lair down around him.

Wizard plays a small role in the "Secret War" crossover event allied with Lucia von Bardas and other B-List supervillains. He has since returned, alive and well, in Fantastic Four #546, with a Frightful Five (himself, Titania, Trapster, Hydro-Man, and Klaw).

The Wizard is among the characters recruited in The Hood's syndicate of villains. He is then seen in a blue uniform reminiscent of his original outfit. Wizard helped them fight the New Avengers but was taken down by Doctor Strange.

During the Secret Invasion storyline, Wizard is one among many of supervillains who rejoined The Hood's crime syndicate and attacked a Skrull force.

During the Dark Reign storyline, Wizard joins with the Hood's gang in an attack on the New Avengers, who were expecting the Dark Avengers instead.

Wizard later appeared as a member of the Intelligencia. Along with a new Frightful Four, the Wizard attacks the Baxter Building to capture Reed Richards. While the Red Hulk, who came to stop the villains, is distracted by the Thing and an open portal to the Negative Zone, Reed is captured.

Lyra and She-Hulk went around hunting for the remaining members of Intelligencia. Wizard was the first to be apprehended by Lyra and She-Hulk, brought to Bruce Banner, and imprisoned. Wizard managed to escape from Bruce Banner's detention cell and attacked Lyra during her prom. His surprise attack had Lyra on the defensive until She-Hulk arrived and defeated Wizard with his own weapons.

He is committed to the P.A.V.L.O.V. Metahuman Psychiatric Facility, following the events of World War Hulks. Reed Richards visits the Wizard there, and informs him that Whitman's clone is in the care of Richards' family. Later after the death of the Human Torch and the reformation of the Fantastic Four as the Future Foundation, rogue agents of A.I.M break the Wizard out of the P.A.V.L.O.V. facility.

When the Sinister Six attacked the Intelligencia, Wizard tried to reason with Sandman due to their old friendship, but this ended when Doctor Octopus used the Zero Cannon that the Intelligencia were using to send Wizard into the upper atmosphere.<ref>The Amazing Spider-Man #676</ref>

MODOK Superior was able to revive Wizard and the other Intelligencia members where they began to formulate their plans after their predicted shatter of the superhero community.

Wizard's mind began to shows signs of dementia, due to punishment inflicted by Black Bolt, so he decided to create a new Frightful Four with Klaw, Karl Malus, and Carnage. He attempted to control Cletus Kasady's mind, but due to his lobotomization, it was impossible. Wizard instead transferred Kassidy's blood into Malus and made him into Superior Carnage. Wizard's goal was to take over NYC City Hall and impress his son, but Superior Spider-Man was able to stop him. Despite losing the battle, Wizard was able to reconnect with his son and regain his mental facilities.

The Wizard subsequently joined the plans of the behind-the-scenes villain known as 'the Quiet Man' to destroy the Fantastic Four, but after his clone rejected him in favour of his friends, followed by him witnessing the scale of the Quiet Man's plans, the Wizard decided to aid the FF against the villain so that he could ensure that his 'son' would grow up in peace.

Wizard then appears talking to MODOK Superior when he hears that Doctor Doom has gone straight, only to confront him. During the battle, he manages to outsmart him with his upgraded tech until Doctor Doom in his version of the Iron Man armor becomes distracted by a vision, giving him the chance to defeat him. Wizard then tells MODOK Superior what happened to other supervillains until Doctor Doom arrives and defeats all of them.

During the "Opening Salvo" part of the Secret Empire storyline, Wizard is recruited by Baron Helmut Zemo to join the Army of Evil.

Bentley 23
The Fantastic Four managed to find an adolescent clone of the Wizard and rescued it from a super robot the Wizard made. He has since been taken in by the Fantastic Four and only refers to himself as 23 feeling he "hasn't earned his name" as the original Wizard did. At first, he was a highly introverted child, who over time becomes far more outgoing, also becoming more openly proclaiming of wanting to grow up to become a supervillain. He has since joined the Future Foundation. While working with them, he has indicated he's at least somewhat evil openly worshiping either Satan or Mephisto. He has since said to Wizard that he has earned the name "Bentley". However, when faced with the chance of working with his father to trap the rest of the Future Foundation and analyze Franklin's powers, Bentley turned against his 'father' because he decided that he wanted to do the right thing, with Wizard accepting his decision as he regards it as an example of how he might have been if he grew up with a more loving family.

Skills and abilities
Wittman have no powers, but is a gifted genius with Ph.Ds for all sciences, particularly in the field of physics. In addition to being an inventor and engineer, Wittman is also a talented stage magician, escapologist, and disguise artist.

Equipment
Wizard has constructed a number of devices for which he employs in his criminal activities:

 His anti-gravity discs can lift several hundred pounds each and be remotely controlled within that armor's relays. These give him the ability to fly, which is accomplished without wings. He was able to create a basic one using materials from the prison workshop.
 His gauntlets (alternatively referred to as Wonder Gloves) could unleash potent electrical blasts or utilize directed gravitational fields to strengthen those hands. The gloves' strength are unknown. They even also launch air vortexes for engulfing their targets known as "Typhoon-Spheres". 
 His body armor provides him with physical protection, generates a force shield around himself, and mimics powers of the Human Torch. The helmet possesses built-in circuitry that allows a technopathic link to his suit, thus manipulating it by mental commands.

Weakness
He suffers from a non-lethal nut allergy (especially peanuts) and consuming them causes his face to swell up.

Other characters named Wizard
There are other characters who have also called themselves Wizard:All Winners Comics #17, which was published in 1945, 17 years before the first appearance of the Fantastic Four villain of the same name, depicts a legend about the eldest member of the Carreaux family, who jilted the daughter of a magic practitioner in favor of marrying a different girl. When the jilted girl committed suicide, her brother killed that Carreaux man, creating a curse which held that if an elder Carreaux were to marry, a dead wizard and his witch partner would appear on their wedding night and kill that Carreaux. By 1946, the Carreaux family butler Frank Lavalle took advantage of that legend when he heard that Philip Carreaux was going to marry a woman named Marguerite, with whom Frank was also in love. While he would pose as the Wizard, an unnamed female accomplice would pose as the Witch. When his brother Dale returned home from military service, Philip met William Nalsted and Fred Davis where he told them about the curse involving the Wizard and the Witch. William Nalsted and Fred Davis changed into their Captain America and Bucky outfit where they explored the bayou finding any evidence of the Wizard and the Witch. Captain America and Bucky encountered the Wizard who disappeared from Captain America's grasp. Upon finding Philip dead with a knife in his back, Captain America and Bucky encountered the Wizard in another canoe, though he had to let him go to save Bucky from an approaching alligator. When Captain America and Bucky catch up to the Witch and subdue her, she was shot dead as Dale freed Marguerite. Upon examining the Wizard's footprints, Captain America discovered that it matched Frank Lavalle's shoes as Captain America apprehends him. After Frank Lavalle confessed to his motives and the murders, Captain America handed Frank over to the authorities.

Following the 1984 Secret Wars miniseries, which concluded with the Thing left on the planet Battleworld, he comes across the kingdom of Leenn, which is being terrorized by the Wizard, who is Laann's version of Doctor Doom, whereas Laann is revealed to be that planet's version of Doctor Doom's native country of Latveria. Thing and his ally, a warrior named Tarianna, vanquishes the Wizard.

Other versions
House of M
In the alternate timeline of the 2005 storyline "House of M", Wizard is seen as a member of Hood's Masters of Evil.

Marvel 1602
In 1602: Fantastick Four, the 17th century version of the Wizard is self-described as "the greatest scientist alive in the year 1602". He claims to have been captain of a ship that reached the edge of the world and found a golden city, with the "Four Most Frightful" as his crew. Shortly before arriving in Atlantis with Otto von Doom, he admits that this was an exaggeration.

Marvel Zombies: Dead Days
A zombified version of Wizard appears in Marvel Zombies: Dead Days alongside the Mole Man, and is eventually infected by the zombie Mr. Fantastic.

MC2
In the MC2 series Fantastic Five, the Wingless Wizard is confined to a hover chair and blames Reed Richards for crippling him. He gathers a new team, the Wizard's Warriors: two women, Dominator and Freefall, and three men, Bullet, Binder and Impact. The team are supplied with the Wizard's various inventions. They attack the Fantastic Five, but the Wizard's real objective is to discover the true location of Reed Richards. Later most of the team are captured by Psi-Lord and Spider-Girl. He and Dominator nevertheless invade Reed Richards' space station in the Negative Zone, but the inbuilt defenses capture them, and Reed states that they must remain in "cold storage" until the rip in the universe is repaired.

JLA/Avengers
In 2003 Marvel/DC crossover JLA/Avengers, the Wizard is among the enthralled villains defending Krona's stronghold when the heroes assault it. He is seen fighting the Black Condor.

In other media
Television
 The Wizard appears in the 1978 Fantastic Four series episode "Frightful Four." This version possesses supernatural powers rather than relying on technological weapons. He assembles Medusa, Sandman, and Trapster for his eponymous team.
 The Wizard appears in the Spider-Man episode "Under the Wizard's Spell", voiced by Brad Crandall. He takes control of Medusa using a special collar to help him steal an electrical device from a military base.
 The Wizard appears in the 1994 Fantastic Four series episode "And the Wind Cries Medusa", voiced by Ron Perlman. He assembles Medusa, Hydro-Man, and Trapster to form the Frightful Four and uses a device to control the Thing.
 The Wizard appears in the Fantastic Four: World's Greatest Heroes episode "Frightful", voiced by Jonathan Holmes. He assembles Klaw, Dragon Man, and Trapster to form the Frightful Four and masquerade as superheroes so they can eventually steal unstable molecules that Mister Fantastic donated to a local university.
 The Wizard appears in Ultimate Spider-Man, voiced by Tom Kenny. In the pilot episode "Great Power", he assembles Klaw, Thundra, and Trapster to form the Frightful Four. After Trapster is captured during a fight with Spider-Man, the Wizard uses a tracking device the former left on the web-slinger to lead the remaining Frightful Four members in attacking him at Midtown High, but Spider-Man fends them off. In the following episode, "Great Responsibility", the Wizard, Thundra, and Klaw attempt to ambush and capture Spider-Man, but are defeated by White Tiger, Power Man, Iron Fist, and Nova. In the episode "Reveal", the Wizard leads the Frightful Four in capturing Spider-Man and his allies before leaving them for Doctor Octopus's Octobots. In the episode "Second Chance Hero", the Wizard leads the Frightful Four in attacking Spider-Man once more, only to be defeated by the webslinger and Norman Osborn as the Iron Patriot.
 The Wizard makes a non-speaking cameo appearance in the Avengers Assemble episode "The Avengers Protocol" Pt. 1.
 Bentley Wittman will appear in the Marvel Cinematic Universe / Disney+ animated series Spider-Man: Freshman Year (2024).

Video games
 The Wizard appears in the 1991 video game Captain America and The Avengers.
 The Wizard appears as a mini-boss in Marvel: Ultimate Alliance 2, voiced by Danny Mann. He and Scorcher attack the heroes at the gates to Lucia von Bardas' castle.
 The Wizard appears as an unlockable character in Lego Marvel Superheroes and Lego Marvel's Avengers''.

References

External links
 Wizard at Marvel.com
 
 

Characters created by Jack Kirby
Characters created by Larry Lieber
Characters created by Stan Lee
Comics characters introduced in 1962
Fictional characters with air or wind abilities
Fictional characters with electric or magnetic abilities
Fictional characters with fire or heat abilities
Fictional characters with gravity abilities
Fictional characters with superhuman durability or invulnerability
Fictional engineers
Fictional inventors
Fictional stage magicians
Fictional technopaths
Marvel Comics characters with superhuman strength
Marvel Comics scientists
Marvel Comics supervillains